Civita (Arbërisht: Çifti) is a hilltown and comune in the province of Cosenza in the Calabria region of southern Italy. Facing the Ionian Sea, it is part of the Pollino National Park.

It was founded in the 15th century by Albanian refugees from the Ottoman invasion. The Civitesi are part of an ethnic minority (Arbëreshë) officially recognized by the Italian laws.

Main sights
Ponte del Diavolo (Devil's Bridge).
Raganello Canyons.
Church with Byzantine mosaics and a precious icon.
Arbëreshë Ethnic Museum.

Notable people
 Gennaro Placco

References

External links
 Photo gallery on igougo.com

Arbëresh settlements
Cities and towns in Calabria